Tuberculosa is a genus of spiders in the family Lycosidae. It was first described in 2006 by Framenau & Yoo. , it contains 4 Australian species.

References

Lycosidae
Araneomorphae genera
Spiders of Australia